The Smyk was a Polish microcar prototype designed in 1957. Its unique characteristic was that the door was located in the front of the car.

Concept
The assumptions were to create the cheapest possible microcar accommodating four people in the 2+2 system, i.e. two adults and two children. Access to the rear seat was possible only after folding the front passenger seat. The door was a tilting (downwards) front cover, so that the sides of the body could carry loads, and the shape of the body itself did not require deeper extrusion. The car did not have a trunk, and on the dashboard there was only a speedometer, a battery charging indicator and a turn signal switch with a indicator light.

As a drive for prototype vehicles served the engine from the Junak M07 motorcycle with a dynamostarter and a blower installed. Independent suspension was used for all four twelve-inch wheels: transversely arranged torsion bars. The wheels were assembled from two parts, of which the inner, light metal served at the same time as the wheel hub, and the outer, steel one as the right wheel. Smyka was also built with a body made of three-layer laminates.

It was planned to start production of Smyk in Szczecin, but the Mikrus MR-300 car was approved for serial production. Smyk was produced by SFM only in a trial series in the amount of 17 copies (some sources give 20 copies).

The designers of the vehicle were:
 Karol Wójcicki
 architect Janusz Zygadlewicz
 Andrzej Zgliczyński

The project was cooperation of Kończykowski, Ossowski, Sawicki, Zaręba, Sitnicki and others.

Specifications
Top speed: 

Fuel consumption: 5l/100 km

Existing examples
There about 10 Smyk's still in existence. These are located as follows:
 Museum of Municipal Engineering in Krakow - 1
 Museum of Technology in Warsaw – 2 
 Museum of Technology and Communication in Szczecin – 2 
 In privately owned – approx. 5

References

Cars of Poland
Microcars